{{DISPLAYTITLE:C12H13N}}
The molecular formula C12H13N (molar mass: 171.24 g/mol, exact mass: 171.1048 u) may refer to:

 The drug rasagiline
 The dye N,N-dimethyl-1-naphthylamine
 More than 400 other chemical compounds

References